Arthur K. Smith (born August 15, 1937) is an American academic. He served as the president of the University of Utah from 1991 to 1997. At the time of his appointment, he was the first non-member of the Church of Jesus Christ of Latter-day Saints to hold the position. He was previously the vice president for academic affairs, provost and acting president of the University of South Carolina, and vice president of administration of the Binghamton University. Smith is a graduate of the United States Naval Academy (1959). He later attended the University of New Hampshire and Cornell University and earned a master's degree in comparative and international politics, as well as a Doctor of Philosophy. He entered the academic profession as a professor of political science at Binghamton. After serving as the president of the University of Utah, Smith then served a dual role as chancellor of the University of Houston System and president of the University of Houston from 1997 to 2003, and later returned to teaching, as professor of Latin American politics at the University of Houston.

References

Cornell University alumni
Chancellors of the University of Houston System
Presidents of the University of Houston
University of Houston faculty
1937 births
Living people
Binghamton University faculty
Presidents of the University of South Carolina